H-dropping or aitch-dropping is the deletion of the voiceless glottal fricative or "H-sound", . The phenomenon is common in many dialects of English, and is also found in certain other languages, either as a purely historical development or as a contemporary difference between dialects. Although common in most regions of England and in some other English-speaking countries, and linguistically speaking a neutral evolution in languages, H-dropping is often stigmatized as a sign of careless or uneducated speech.

The reverse phenomenon, H-insertion or H-adding, is found in certain situations, sometimes as an allophone or  hypercorrection by H-dropping speakers, and sometimes as a spelling pronunciation or out of perceived etymological correctness. A particular example of this is the spread of 'haitch' for 'aitch'.

In English

Historical /h/-loss
The  sound appeared at the start of a syllable, either alone or in a cluster with another consonant. The other two sounds were used in the syllable coda ( after back vowels and  after front vowels).

Most of the initial clusters involving  also disappeared (see H-cluster reductions). As a result, in the standard varieties of Modern English, the only position in which  can occur is at the start of a syllable, either alone (as in hat, house, behind, etc.), in the cluster  (as in huge), or (for a minority of speakers) in the cluster  (as in whine if pronounced differently from wine).

Contemporary H-dropping
The phenomenon of H-dropping considered as a feature of contemporary English is the omission, in certain accents and dialects, of this syllable-initial , either alone or in the cluster . (For the cluster  and its reduction, see Pronunciation of English ⟨wh⟩.)

Description
H-dropping, in certain accents and dialects of Modern English, causes words like harm, heat, home and behind to be pronounced arm, eat, ome and be-ind (though in some dialects an [h] may appear in behind to prevent hiatus – see below).

Cases of H-dropping occur in all English dialects in the weak forms of function words like he, him, her, his, had, and have. The pronoun it is a product of historical H-dropping – the older hit survives as an emphatic form in a few dialects such as Southern American English, and in the Scots language. These can be spelled out in informal writing as "should've", "would've", and "could've". Because  is also the weak form of the word of, these words are often misspelled as should of, would of and could of.

History
There is evidence of h-dropping in texts from the 13th century and later. It may originally have arisen through contact with the Norman language, where h-dropping also occurred. Puns which rely on the possible omission of the  sound can be found in works by William Shakespeare and in other Elizabethan era dramas. It is suggested that the phenomenon probably spread from the middle to the lower orders of society, first taking hold in urban centers. It started to become stigmatized, being seen as a sign of poor education, in the 16th or 17th century.

Geographical distribution

H-dropping occurs (variably) in most of the dialects of the English language in England and Welsh English, including Cockney, West Country English, West Midlands English (including Brummie), East Midlands English, most of northern England (including Yorkshire and Lancashire), and Cardiff English. It is not generally found in Scottish English and Irish English. It is also typically absent in certain regions of England and Wales, including Northumberland, East Anglia and most of North Wales.

H-dropping also occurs in some Jamaican English, and perhaps in other Caribbean English (including some of The Bahamas). It is not generally found in North American English, although it has been reported in Newfoundland (outside the Avalon Peninsula). However, dropping of /h/ from the cluster /hj/ (so that human is pronounced ) is found in some American dialects, as well as in parts of Ireland – see reduction of /hj/.

Social distribution and stigmatization
H-dropping, in the countries and regions in which it is prevalent, occurs mainly in working-class accents. Studies have shown it to be significantly more frequent in lower than in higher social groups. It is not a feature of RP (the prestige accent of England), or even of "Near-RP", a variant of RP that includes some regional features. This does not always apply, however, to the dropping of /h/ in weak forms of words like his and her.

H-dropping in English is widely stigmatized, being perceived as a sign of poor or uneducated speech, and discouraged by schoolteachers. John Wells writes that it seems to be "the single most powerful pronunciation shibboleth in England."

Use and status of the H-sound in H-dropping dialects
In fully H-dropping dialects, that is, in dialects without a phonemic , the sound  may still occur but with uses other than distinguishing words. An epenthetic  may be used to avoid hiatus, so that for example the egg is pronounced the hegg. That is,  has become an allophone of the zero onset in these dialects.

Insertion of [h] may occur as a means of emphasis, as noted above, and also as a response to the formality of a situation. Sandhi phenomena may also indicate a speaker's awareness of the presence of an  – for example, some speakers might say "a edge" (rather than "an edge") for a hedge, and might omit the linking R before an initial vowel resulting from a dropped H.

It is likely that the phonemic system of children in H-dropping areas lacks an /h/ entirely, but that social and educational pressures lead to the incorporation of an (inconsistently realized) /h/ into the system by the time of adulthood.

H-insertion
The opposite of H-dropping, called H-insertion or H-adding, sometimes occurs as a hypercorrection in typically H-dropping accents of English. It is commonly noted in literature from late Victorian times to the early 20th century that some lower-class people consistently drop h in words that should have it, while adding h to words that should not have it. An example from the musical My Fair Lady is, "In 'Artford, 'Ereford, and 'Ampshire, 'urricanes 'ardly hever 'appen". Another is in C. S. Lewis' The Magician's Nephew: "Three cheers for the Hempress of Colney 'Atch". In practice, however, it would appear that h-adding is more of a stylistic prosodic effect, being found on some words receiving particular emphasis, regardless of whether those words are h-initial or vowel-initial in the standard language.

Some English words borrowed from French may begin with the letter  but not with the sound . Examples include heir, and, in many regional pronunciations, hour, hono(u)r and honest. In some cases, spelling pronunciation has introduced the sound  into such words, as in humble, hotel and (for most speakers) historic. Spelling pronunciation has also added  to the British English pronunciation of herb, while American English retains the older pronunciation . The name of the letter H itself, "aitch", is subject to H-insertion in some dialects, where it is pronounced "haitch". (In Hiberno-English, "haitch" has come to be considered standard, consistent with its not-an-H-dropping dialects).

List of homophones resulting from H-dropping
The following is a list of some pairs of English words which may become homophones when H-dropping occurs. (To view the list, click "show".) See also the list of H-dropping homophones in Wiktionary.

In other languages
Processes of H-dropping have occurred in various languages at certain times, and in some cases, they remain as distinguishing features between dialects, as in English. Some Dutch dialects, especially the southern ones, feature H-dropping. The dialects of Zeeland, West and East Flanders, most of Antwerp and Flemish Brabant, and the west of North Brabant have lost /h/ as a phonemic consonant but use [h] to avoid hiatus and to signal emphasis, much as in the H-dropping dialects of English. H-dropping is also found in some North Germanic languages, for instance Elfdalian and the dialect of Roslagen, where it is found already in Old East Norse. Also the Low Saxon speaking area around Zwolle, Kampen and Meppel have h-dropping.

The phoneme  in Ancient Greek, occurring only at the beginnings of words and originally written with the letter H and later as a rough breathing, was lost in the Ionic dialect. It is also not pronounced in Modern Greek.

The phoneme  was lost in Late Latin, the ancestor of the modern Romance languages. Both French and Spanish acquired new initial  in medieval times, but they were later lost in both languages in a "second round" of H-dropping.

In Maltese,  existed as a phoneme until the 19th century. It was then lost in most positions, sometimes lengthening the adjacent vowel. Chiefly word-finally it was merged with //. The latter phoneme, in turn, may now be pronounced  by some speakers, chiefly in the syllable onset.

Many dialects of Persian, primarily dialects spoken in Afghanistan, do not pronounce the phenome . If a short vowel and a long vowel are both paired to the phoneme, the long vowel replaces both the phoneme  and the short vowel attached to it.

The modern Javanese language typically does not have  in its native words. For instance, in modern Javanese, the word for "rain" is udan, from Old Javanese hudan, which ultimately comes from Proto-Austronesian *quzaN. In modern Javanese,  only appears in loanwords from Indonesian and English. Since the Javanese people have been exposed to Dutch for far longer than it is with Indonesian or standard literary Malay (which only started somewhere after 1900 and amplified after 1945, excluding Surinamese Javanese), many of the words borrowed from Dutch have also lost the phoneme, such as andhuk /aɳˈɖ̥(ʰ)ʊʔ/ "towel" from Dutch handdoek.

See also
Phonological history of English
Phonological history of English consonants
Aspirated h

References

Phonology
English phonology